Farm to Market Road 331 (FM 331) is a farm to market road in eastern Austin County, Texas.

Route description
FM 331 begins at an intersection with  SH 36 north of Sealy. The route travels to the north into the small community of Burleigh, where it has a brief concurrency with  FM 529. It continues northward, roughly paralleling the Brazos River to its east, before state maintenance ends at Oil Field Road near the community of Raccoon Bend. Oil Field Road continues into the town and provides access to  SH 159.

History
FM 331 was originally designated along a  stretch from SH 159 in Bellville to Burleigh on June 16, 1945. On October 31, 1958, the highway was extended southward  from Burleigh to SH 36 southeast of Peters. The highway was rerouted on April 6, 1970, when the original section from Bellville to Burleigh was redesignated as part of FM 529; the section north of Burleigh to Raccoon Bend, which was formerly FM 2916, was also added to the route.

Major intersections

Gallery

Notes

References

0331
Transportation in Austin County, Texas